A disintegrin and metalloproteinase with thrombospondin motifs 9 is an enzyme that in humans is encoded by the ADAMTS9 gene.

This gene encodes a member of the ADAMTS (a disintegrin and metalloproteinase with thrombospondin motifs) protein family. Members of the family share several distinct protein modules, including a propeptide region, a metalloproteinase domain, a disintegrin-like domain, and a thrombospondin type 1 (TS) motif. Individual members of this family differ in the number of C-terminal TS motifs, and some have unique C-terminal domains. Members of the ADAMTS family have been implicated in the cleavage of proteoglycans, the control of organ shape during development, and the inhibition of angiogenesis. This gene is localized to chromosome 3p14.3-p14.2, an area known to be lost in hereditary renal tumors.

References

Further reading

External links
 The MEROPS online database for peptidases and their inhibitors: M12.021
 

ADAMTS